Theodor Amadeus Müller (20 May 1798, Leipzig - 11 March 1846 in Weimar) was a German violinist. He was the son of the composer August Eberhard Müller. He learned violin under Louis Spohr before performing as a violinist in the chapel-orchestra of the Grand Duke of Saxe-Weimar-Eisenach. He composed orchestral works along with several solos and duets for violin, which were much praised in their time.

External links 
Robert Eitner: August Eberhard Müller. In: Allgemeine Deutsche Biographie (ADB). Vol 22, Duncker & Humblot, Leipzig 1885, p. 515–517.

1798 births
1846 deaths
German composers
German violinists
German male violinists
Musicians from Leipzig
Pupils of Louis Spohr
19th-century German musicians
19th-century German male musicians

de:August Eberhard Müller